Events in the year 2019 in Ivory Coast.

Incumbents
 President: Alassane Ouattara
 Prime Minister: Amadou Gon Coulibaly

Events
6 February – Former president Laurent Gbagbo is cleared of crimes against humanity and released to Belgium.
6 August – Ivory Coast and Ghana set a base price of US $2,600 per ton for 2020-21 cocoa prices.
24 December: Presidential candidate and former rebel leader Guillaume Soro diverts his plane to Ghana after the government issued an arrest warrant for him.

Sports
14 September to 18 October: Scheduled date for the 2019 World Draughts Championship, to be held in Yamoussoukro

Deaths

19 January – Barthélémy Kotchy, writer and politician (b. 1934)
9 March – Bernard Binlin Dadié, novelist, playwright and poet, Minister of Culture (b. 1916)
12 August – DJ Arafat, 33, singer and drummer; motorcycle accident

References

 
2010s in Ivory Coast 
Years of the 21st century in Ivory Coast 
Ivory Coast 
Ivory Coast